Carolus Adrianus Maria Thole (20 April 1914 – 26 March 2000) was a Dutch-Italian painter and illustrator.

He was born in Bussum, near Amsterdam, and was educated at State Drawing School of Amsterdam's Rijksmuseum.

His first works were for advertisement and publishing companies, but he also painted glasses and walls. In 1958 Thole moved to Milan, Italy, with his wife and four sons. At first he worked for Rizzoli publisher, before passing to Mondadori in 1960. After several covers for various magazines and books, he became renowned for his long work for science fiction magazine Urania, where his deep art culture, taste for surrealism and weird sense of humour could show at their best. For Mondadori he worked to a host of other series, including mysteries and romantic series for women.

In 1980s Thole experienced an eye disease that compelled him to reduce his work activity and to leave Urania covers to Vicente Segrelles and Oscar Chichoni. His last work for Urania is for N°1330 of 1998: in the meantime, Thole earned a robust fame as one of the greatest European book cover artists. He worked also for French and German publishers.

Thole died in 2000 in Cannobio, a town on the Lago Maggiore in Northern Italy.

See also
The article Urania contains a cover gallery with artworks by Thole.

External links
 http://www.fantascienza.com/801/una-persona-che-non-dimentichero-mai-karel-thole A tribute to Thole's art (in Italian). First published in magazine Delos Science Fiction 55 in April 2000
www.mondourania.com A site with all the Thole covers for the science fiction magazine Urania
www.sf-buch.de/sf-buch/artikel/nachruf_karel_thole.html Obituary with German Thole covers
 

1914 births
2000 deaths
Science fiction artists
People from Bussum
20th-century Dutch painters
Dutch male painters
Dutch contemporary artists
Dutch illustrators
20th-century Dutch male artists